The Buffalo Sabres are a professional hockey team that came into existence in 1970 and have participated in 42 National Hockey League Entry Drafts. The Sabres also made selections in six NHL Supplemental Drafts.

This list features every player drafted by the Sabres and his regular season stats for his career. All stats are current as of the 2013 NHL Draft. Players whose names appear in bold are on the current Sabres roster.

Buffalo's first draft pick was Gilbert Perreault, taken 1st overall in the 1970 NHL Entry Draft. Buffalo has selected first overall four times. Their second 1st overall pick was Pierre Turgeon in 1987. Their third 1st overall pick was Rasmus Dahlin in 2018. Their fourth 1st overall pick was Owen Power in 2021. Thirteen picks have gone on to play over 1,000 NHL games: Dave Andreychuk, Phil Housley, Pierre Turgeon, Gilbert Perreault, Calle Johansson, Mike Ramsey, Craig Ramsay, Keith Carney, Brad May and Sean O'Donnell. Perreault and Housley have been elected to the Hockey Hall of Fame.

Key
 Played at least one game with the Sabres
 Spent entire NHL career with the Sabres

Draft picks
Statistics are complete as of the 2021–22 NHL season and show each player's career regular season totals in the NHL.  Wins, losses, ties, overtime losses and goals against average apply to goaltenders and are used only for players at that position.

See also
NHL Entry Draft
List of NHL first overall draft choices
List of undrafted NHL players with 100 games played
List of NHL players

Notes 
1974: The 183rd pick of the draft was an invalid claim for the fictional player Taro Tsujimoto of the Tokyo Katanas. The pick stood as valid for several weeks until it was revealed that the player was made up. The Sabres still list the claim as valid as an inside joke.

1984: The 186th pick of the draft was an invalid claim for Eric Weinrich, who had yet to clear the minimum age restriction for eligible draftees. He was selected the following year by the New Jersey Devils.

References
General

Draft history: 
Player stats: 
Player stats: 

Specific

 
draft
Buffalo Sabres